Founders at Work: Stories of Startups' Early Days (2007) is a book written by Jessica Livingston composed of interviews she did with the founders of famous technology companies concerning what happened in their early years.

Interviews
 Max Levchin - PayPal
 Sabeer Bhatia - Hotmail
 Steve Wozniak - Apple Computer
 Joe Kraus - Excite
 Dan Bricklin - Software Arts
 Mitch Kapor - Lotus
 Ray Ozzie -  Iris Associates, Groove Networks
 Evan Williams - Pyra Labs (Blogger.com)
 Tim Brady - Yahoo
 Mike Lazaridis - Research in Motion
 Arthur van Hoff - Marimba
 Paul Buchheit - Gmail
 Steve Perlman - WebTV
 Mike Ramsay - TiVo
 Paul Graham - Viaweb
 Joshua Schachter - del.icio.us
 Mark Fletcher - ONElist, Bloglines
 Craig Newmark - craigslist
 Caterina Fake - Flickr
 Brewster Kahle - WAIS, Internet Archive, Alexa Internet
 Charles Geschke - Adobe
 Ann Winblad - Open Systems, Hummer Winblad
 David Heinemeier Hansson - 37signals
 Philip Greenspun - ArsDigita
 Joel Spolsky - Fog Creek Software
 Steve Kaufer - TripAdvisor
 James Hong - HOT or NOT
 James Currier - Tickle
 Blake Ross - Creator of Firefox
 Mena Trott - Six Apart
 Bob Davis - Lycos
 Ron Gruner - Alliant Computer, Shareholder.com

Reception
Chris Anderson, editor-in-chief of Wired Magazine stated "this book offers both wisdom and engaging insights straight from the source."
The Motley Fool says "The stories are fascinating, filled with many valuable lessons."
Silicon India list it at the top of its list Five Books that Every Entrepreneur Must Read

References

External links 

2007 non-fiction books
Business books
Books of interviews